FIFA, through several companies, sold the rights for the broadcast of the 1998 FIFA World Cup to the following broadcasters.

Television broadcasters 

Notes:
  Indonesia screened the tournament simulcast via 6-national free-to-air terrestrial television stations. It was broadcast simultaneously by 1-national state-owned public free-to-air terrestrial television station (TVRI) and relayed by the 5-national private commercial free-to-air terrestrial television stations (RCTI, SCTV, TPI, ANteve, and Indosiar). They provided Indonesian sports commentary on all 64 matches.
  It is a joint venture of TF1, France Télévisions and TV5Monde.
  ITV did not use the official FIFA live feed. Instead, they took their own camera equipment over to France and shot the matches from the opposite side of the pitch of the FIFA feed cameras. This seen the station use their own on-screen graphics and enabled U.K. viewers to see the Vauxhall billboards (U.K. arm of General Motors).

Radio broadcasters

References 

Broadcasting rights
FIFA World Cup broadcasting rights